Fuhrmans Mill is an unincorporated community in York County, Pennsylvania, United States.

References

Unincorporated communities in York County, Pennsylvania
Unincorporated communities in Pennsylvania